I Am is Mao Denda's third studio album and first in 8 years. It was released on December 9, 2009 and peaked at #25 on the weekly Oricon albums chart.

Track listing

Charts

Oricon Sales Charts

External links
 

2009 albums
Mao Denda albums
Universal Music Japan albums